Soft money is a lightly regulated form of financing campaigns, used in financing electoral campaigns in the United States.

Soft money also may refer to: 
 Economics:
 Soft currency,  a currency which is expected to fluctuate erratically or depreciate relative to other currencies
 Fiat money
 Titled works:
 Soft Money (film), a 1919 film 
 Soft Money (album), a 2006 album by Jel